Actia nitidiventris is a species of parasitic fly in the family Tachinidae. It is found in Central America.

References

Further reading

 
 

nitidiventris
Articles created by Qbugbot
Insects described in 1933